The 2005 Rally Japan was the 13th round of the 2005 World Rally Championship. It took place between September 30 and October 2, 2005. Peugeot's Marcus Grönholm won the race after capitalizing on then-leader Petter Solberg's accident after his Subaru hit a rock on the penultimate stage. It was Grönholm's 18th win in the World Rally Championship which he would dedicate to the late Michael Park, who was killed in an accident during the previous round, the Wales Rally GB. 

Citroën's Sébastien Loeb finished in second place and thus became World Rally Champion in back-to-back seasons.

Results

References

External links
 Results at ewrc-results.com

Japan
Rally Japan
Rally